Salin Township is a township of Minbu District in the Magway Division of Myanmar.  The principal town is Salin.

References 

Townships of Magway Region